The 1969 Walker Cup, the 22nd Walker Cup Match, was played on August 22 and 23, 1969, at Milwaukee Country Club, River Hills near Milwaukee, Wisconsin. The event was won by the United States 10 to 8 with 6 matches halved. The United States led by 4 points after the first day and, although Great Britain and Ireland won both the foursomes and singles sessions on the second day, the United States won by two points.

Format
The format for play on Friday and Saturday was the same. There were four matches of foursomes in the morning and eight singles matches in the afternoon. In all, 24 matches were played.

Each of the 24 matches was worth one point in the larger team competition. If a match was all square after the 18th hole extra holes were not played. The team with most points won the competition. If the two teams were tied, the previous winner would retain the trophy. This was the last Walker Cup in which half points were not awarded for halved matches.

Teams
Ten players for the United States and Great Britain & Ireland participated in the event. Great Britain & Ireland had a playing captain, while the United States had a non-playing captain.

United States

Captain: Billy Joe Patton
John Bohmann
Bruce Fleisher
Vinny Giles
Bill Hyndman
Joe Inman
Steve Melnyk
Allen Miller
Dick Siderowf
Ed Updegraff
Lanny Wadkins

Great Britain & Ireland
 & 
Playing captain:  Michael Bonallack
 Peter Benka
 Andrew Brooks
 Tom Craddock
 Bruce Critchley
 Rodney Foster
 Charlie Green
 Michael King
 Geoff Marks
 Peter Tupling

Friday's matches

Morning foursomes

Afternoon singles

Saturday's matches

Morning foursomes

Afternoon singles

References

Walker Cup
Walker Cup
Walker Cup
Golf in Wisconsin
LPGA Championship
Sports competitions in Wisconsin
Sports in the Milwaukee metropolitan area
Tourist attractions in Milwaukee County, Wisconsin
Walker Cup